Welder da Silva Marçal, known as Weldinho, is a Brazilian footballer who last played for Figueirense.

Career
He started his career in the youth ranks of Paulista Futebol Clube and in 2010 he won the Paulista Cup title. The defender made 37 starts and was directly observed by the Technical Committee of Timon Esporte Clube. The main features of this right-back is his accuracy at junctions and support at the bottom line. He was part of the Brazilian championship team in 2011.

Career statistics
(Correct )

Honours
Corinthians
Campeonato Brasileiro Série A: 2011
Copa Libertadores: 2012

References

External links

Living people
1991 births
Brazilian footballers
Brazilian expatriate footballers
Paulista Futebol Clube players
Sport Club Corinthians Paulista players
Sociedade Esportiva Palmeiras players
Sporting CP footballers
Campeonato Brasileiro Série A players
Grêmio Esportivo Brasil players
Expatriate footballers in Portugal
Brazilian expatriate sportspeople in Portugal
People from Franca
Association football defenders
Footballers from São Paulo (state)